Marjorie Lord (née Wollenberg; July 26, 1918 – November 28, 2015) was an American television and film actress. She played Kathy "Clancy" O'Hara Williams, opposite Danny Thomas's character on The Danny Thomas Show (also known as Make Room for Daddy).

Early years
Lord was born in San Francisco, California, the daughter of Lillian Rosalie (née Edgar) and George Charles Wollenberg. During her early childhood, she was a ballet dancer. Her father was a cosmetics executive. Her paternal grandparents were German, as were two of her maternal great-grandparents. Her family moved to New York City when she was 15.

Career

Stage
In 1935, at the age of 16, Lord made her Broadway debut in The Old Maid with Judith Anderson. Her other Broadway appearances came in Signature (1945), Little Brown Jug (1946), and The Girl in the Freudian Slip (1967).

Although most of Lord's success came in television, she said in 1963: "I am primarily a stage actress. That's what I was trained to do and that's my first love."

In the 1970s, Lord was active in dinner theater productions, spending 34 weeks in such presentations in 1973 alone.

Film
One film reference book summarized Lord's movie career by saying, "For two decades, she played leading roles in mostly routine films ..."

Lord was signed by RKO Radio Pictures in 1935. While appearing in Springtime for Henry with Edward Everett Horton, director Henry Koster approached her and signed her to a contract with Universal Studios.  She appeared in six feature films and a film serial The Adventures of Smilin' Jack for Universal. Her film work includes a number of wartime pictures, including the 1943 mystery Sherlock Holmes in Washington, starring Basil Rathbone in the title role. She also appeared in the Western films Masked Raiders, Mexican Manhunt, and Down Laredo Way. In 1966, she played Mrs. Martha Meade, the wife of Bob Hope's character, in the screwball comedy Boy, Did I Get a Wrong Number!.

Television
Lord appeared in a 1950 episode of The Lone Ranger titled "Bullets for Ballots", also featuring Craig Stevens, and a 1955 episode entitled "The Law Lady". She appeared on the 1951 episode "The Return of Trigger Dawson" of Bill Williams's syndicated western television series The Adventures of Kit Carson and the 1954 production of "Shadow of Truth" on Ford Theatre.

In 1956, while she was appearing in Anniversary Waltz, Lord caught the attention of Danny Thomas, who asked her to replace Jean Hagen as his television wife on Make Room for Daddy. Hagen had played Thomas' wife since the series' inception, but she was written out of the script in 1956. Lord accepted the role and joined the cast of the show, now called The Danny Thomas Show. She played the role until the show was cancelled in 1964. In 1970, Lord and Thomas, along with several other original supporting actors, returned to television with Make Room for Granddaddy. The show lasted just one season.

Later years
Lord remained active beyond her 90th birthday. On May 8, 2008, she participated in a "Salute to Television Moms" panel discussion organized by the Academy of Television Arts and Sciences.

Recognition
Lord has a star in the television section of the Hollywood Walk of Fame, at 6317 Hollywood Boulevard. The star was dedicated on February 8, 1960.

Personal life
Lord was married three times. She wed actor John Archer on December 30, 1941, and they had two children, including actress Anne Archer. They were married from 1941 until their divorce in 1955. Her second husband was producer Randolph Hale, to whom she was married from 1958 until his death in 1974. Her third husband was Harry Volk, the former CEO of Union Bank and a Los Angeles philanthropist, to whom she was married from 1976 until his death in 2000. Her memoir is entitled A Dance and a Hug. Lord is grandmother of Tommy Davis, son of her daughter Anne, both of whom are noted members of the Church of Scientology.

Death
Lord died on November 28, 2015, aged 97, at her home in Beverly Hills, California of natural causes. She is survived by her daughter Anne Archer, her son, Gregg Archer, grandchildren Tommy Davis, Jeffrey Jastrow, Tracey McCarter, Adelle Archer, and Nathan Archer, and three great-grandchildren. Upon her death, she was cremated and her ashes given to her son, Gregg Archer.

Filmography

Film

Television

Stage

Bibliography
A Dance and a Hug, by Marjorie Lord (2004)

References

External links

 
 
 
 
 
 

1918 births
2015 deaths
20th-century American actresses
American film actresses
American stage actresses
American television actresses
American people of German descent
Actresses from San Francisco
Actresses from New York City
American women writers
Writers from Los Angeles
21st-century American women